Clepsis jordaoi is a species of moth of the family Tortricidae. It is found in São Paulo, Brazil.

The wingspan is about 16 mm. The ground colour of the forewings is whitish, sprinkled and strigulated (finely streaked) with brownish. The hindwings are cream.

Etymology
The species name refers to the type locality Campos do Jordão.

References

Moths described in 2010
Clepsis